The 1930 Union Bulldogs football team was an American football team that represented Union University of Jackson, Tennessee as a member of the Southern Intercollegiate Athletic Association (SIAA) during the 1930 college football season. Led by Roy Stewart in his fourth season as head coach, the Bulldogs compiled an overall record of 1–5–2.

Schedule

References

Union
Union (Tennessee) Bulldogs football seasons
Union Bulldogs football